Aki Ulander (born 29 December 1981 in Oulu) is a Finnish basketball player. He stands 6'10 tall and weighs 255lbs. Ulander has been a member of the Finland national basketball team for several years.

Career

Season 2008-2009:

Swedish Championship League: Sundsvall Dragons, Sundsvall, Sweden

Past seasons
Lappeenrannan NMKY, Lappeenranta, Finland / FIBA Eurocup: Team Lappeenranta
Sallen Basket, Uppsala, Sweden
Namika Lahti, Lahti, Finland
Ciudad De Palencia, Palencia, Spain
Honka Playboys, Espoo, Finland
Pussihukat, Vantaa, Finland

Titles
Latest:
Swedish League: League Champion 2009
Finnish League: Bronze Medal 2008
Finnish League: Regular Season Champion 2008
Finnish Cup: Cup Champion 2007
Finnish League: Regular Season Champion 2004
Finnish League: League Champion 2003
Finnish League: Regular Season Champion 2000

External links 
Fiba Europe
LrNMKY/Team Lappeenranta
Finnish League Statistics Service

1981 births
Living people
Finnish men's basketball players
Sportspeople from Oulu